Delete History is a 2020 French-Belgian comedy film co-produced, written and directed by Benoît Delépine and Gustave Kervern. It was selected to compete for the Golden Bear in the main competition section at the 70th Berlin International Film Festival. At Berlin, the film won the Silver Bear 70th Berlinale prize. The film is also scheduled to show at the 2020 Angoulême Film Festival.

Cast
 Blanche Gardin as Marie
 Denis Podalydès as Bertrand
 Corinne Masiero as Christine
 Vincent Lacoste as sex taper
 Benoît Poelvoorde as delivery man
 Bouli Lanners as Dieu
 Vincent Dedienne as organic farmer
 Philippe Rebbot as lazy man
 Michel Houellebecq as suicidal client
 Clémentine Peyricot as Cathya
 Lucas Mondher as Sylvain
 Jackie Berroyer as picky neighbor
 Denis O'Hare as American millionnaire

Post production 
Yolande Moreau's scene was cut out from the film. She is a frequent collaborator of the directors.

Reception
In France, the film averages 4/5 on the AlloCiné from 31 press reviews. On the review aggregator website Rotten Tomatoes, which categorizes reviews only as positive or negative,  of  reviews are positive.

References

External links
 

2020 films
2020 comedy films
Belgian comedy films
French comedy films
2020s French-language films
Films about social media
Films directed by Benoît Delépine
Films directed by Gustave Kervern
Films postponed due to the COVID-19 pandemic
French-language Belgian films
2020s French films